"Love Not War (The Tampa Beat)" is a song by American singer Jason Derulo and New Caledonian beat maker Nuka. It was released as a single on November 20, 2020, by Sony Music, as a re-work of Nuka's "4 Brylean (WayzRmx2018)". The song was written by Jacob Kasher, Jason Derulo, Ridge Manuka Maukava and Shawn Charles.

Music video
A music video to accompany the release of "Love Not War" was first released onto YouTube on November 24, 2020.

Personnel
Credits adapted from Tidal.

 Nuka – composer, lyricist, producer, associated performer
 Jacob Kasher – composer, lyricist
 Jason Derulo – composer, lyricist, associated performer, vocal
 Shawn Charles – composer, lyricist
 John Hanes – engineer
 Charles Gibson – guitar
 Kevin Tuffy – mastering engineer
 Serban Ghenea – mixing engineer
 Ben Hogarth – vocal engineer

Charts

Weekly charts

Year-end charts

Certifications

See also
List of Airplay 100 number ones of the 2020s
Make love, not war

References

2020 songs
2020 singles
Jason Derulo songs
Number-one singles in Poland
Number-one singles in Romania
Songs written by Jason Derulo
Sony Music singles
Songs written by Jacob Kasher